Colleen Davis (born 1979/1980) is an American politician and a member of the Democratic Party serving as the Delaware State Treasurer.

As a child, Davis moved from the suburbs of Baltimore, Maryland to Sussex County, Delaware, where she grew up. She graduated from Indian River High School in 1998 and attended Philadelphia University on a soccer scholarship. Prior to running for office, she worked as a financial consultant for medical systems. In 2016, she moved to Dagsboro, Delaware with her husband Anthony and their three children.

Davis ran for State Treasurer in the 2018 elections and defeated incumbent Republican Ken Simpler. Her victory was a major upset and was one of several losses for prominent Republicans in Delaware. She was sworn into office on January 1, 2019.

In November 2018, Davis was issued citations for driving on a suspended license and failure to show insurance and registration. Although she told a police officer that she has not driven on her suspended license, her claims were contradicted by a photo posted on the Facebook page of Tom Carper, who had campaigned with Davis. She pled guilty to speeding on December 20, 2018, and the other charges were dropped. It was the fourth time she had been charged with driving on a suspended license, after pleading guilty to the charge when she was 17 and pleading guilty to lesser charges twice when she was an adult.

Electoral history

References

External links 
Official website of the Delaware State Treasurer
Campaign website

21st-century American women politicians
21st-century American politicians
Delaware Democrats
Delaware politicians convicted of crimes
Living people
People from Sussex County, Delaware
American women's soccer players
Soccer players from Delaware
Women's association football sweepers
Philadelphia Lady Rams soccer players
State treasurers of Delaware
Women in Delaware politics
Year of birth missing (living people)